This is a list of cathedrals by country, including both actual cathedrals (seats of bishops in episcopal denominations, such as Catholicism, Anglicanism, and Orthodoxy) and a few prominent churches from non-episcopal denominations commonly referred to as "cathedral", usually having formerly acquired that status. As of December 2018, the Catholic Church had 3,391 cathedral-level churches; Cathedral (3,037), Co-cathedral (312), and Pro-cathedral (42) status around the world, predominantly in countries with a significant Roman Catholic population: Italy (368), Brazil (287), United States (215), India (183), France (110), Mexico (100), Spain (88), Philippines (88), Colombia (86), Canada (79) and Argentina (72).

Africa

List of cathedrals in Algeria
List of cathedrals in Angola
List of cathedrals in Benin
List of cathedrals in Botswana
List of cathedrals in Burkina Faso
List of cathedrals in Burundi
List of cathedrals in Cameroon
List of cathedrals in the Central African Republic
List of cathedrals in Chad
List of cathedrals in the Democratic Republic of the Congo
List of cathedrals in the Republic of the Congo
List of cathedrals in Egypt
List of cathedrals in Ghana
List of cathedrals in Ivory Coast
List of cathedrals in Liberia
List of cathedrals in Madagascar
List of cathedrals in Malawi
List of cathedrals in Morocco
List of cathedrals in Mozambique
List of cathedrals in Nigeria
List of cathedrals in Rwanda
List of cathedrals in Senegal
List of cathedrals in South Africa
List of cathedrals in Tanzania
List of cathedrals in Zambia
List of cathedrals in Zimbabwe

Americas

List of cathedrals in Antigua and Barbuda
List of cathedrals in Argentina
List of cathedrals in the Bahamas
List of cathedrals in Barbados
List of cathedrals in Belize
List of cathedrals in Bermuda
List of cathedrals in Bolivia
List of cathedrals in Brazil
List of cathedrals in Canada
List of cathedrals in Chile
List of cathedrals in Colombia
List of cathedrals in Costa Rica
List of cathedrals in Cuba
List of cathedrals in Dominica
List of cathedrals in the Dominican Republic
List of cathedrals in Ecuador
List of cathedrals in El Salvador
List of cathedrals in Guatemala
List of cathedrals in Haiti
List of cathedrals in Honduras
List of cathedrals in Mexico
List of cathedrals in Nicaragua
List of cathedrals in Panama
List of cathedrals in Paraguay
List of cathedrals in Peru
List of cathedrals in the United States
List of cathedrals in Uruguay
List of cathedrals in Venezuela

Asia

List of cathedrals in Armenia
List of cathedrals in Azerbaijan
List of cathedrals in Bangladesh
List of cathedrals in Cambodia
List of cathedrals in China
List of cathedrals in East Timor
List of cathedrals in Hong Kong
List of cathedrals in India
List of cathedrals in Indonesia
List of cathedrals in Iraq
List of cathedrals in Israel
List of cathedrals in Japan
List of cathedrals in Kazakhstan
Cathedrals in North Korea
List of cathedrals in South Korea
List of cathedrals in Lebanon
Cathedrals in Macau
List of cathedrals in Malaysia
List of cathedrals in Myanmar
List of cathedrals in the State of Palestine
List of cathedrals in Pakistan
List of cathedrals in the Philippines
List of cathedrals in Sri Lanka
List of cathedrals in Syria
List of cathedrals in Taiwan
List of cathedrals in Thailand
List of cathedrals in Turkey
List of cathedrals in Vietnam

Europe

List of cathedrals in Albania
List of cathedrals in Austria
List of cathedrals in Belarus
List of cathedrals in Belgium
List of cathedrals in Bosnia and Herzegovina
List of cathedrals in Bulgaria
List of cathedrals in Croatia
List of cathedrals in the Czech Republic
List of cathedrals in Denmark
List of cathedrals in England
List of cathedrals in Estonia
List of cathedrals in Finland
List of cathedrals in France
List of cathedrals in Germany
List of cathedrals in Hungary
List of cathedrals in Iceland
List of cathedrals in Ireland
List of cathedrals in Italy
List of cathedrals in Latvia
List of cathedrals in Lithuania
List of cathedrals in Malta
List of cathedrals in Montenegro
List of cathedrals in the Netherlands
List of cathedrals in Norway
List of cathedrals in Poland
List of cathedrals in Portugal
List of cathedrals in Romania
List of cathedrals in Russia
List of cathedrals in Scotland
List of cathedrals in Serbia
List of cathedrals in Slovakia
List of cathedrals in Slovenia
List of cathedrals in Spain
List of cathedrals in Sweden
List of cathedrals in Switzerland
List of cathedrals in Turkey
List of cathedrals in Ukraine
List of cathedrals in the United Kingdom
List of cathedrals in Wales

Oceania

List of cathedrals in Australia
List of cathedrals in New Zealand
List of cathedrals in Papua New Guinea
List of cathedrals in Solomon Islands

See also 

 Church (building)
 Co-cathedral
 Duomo
 Minster (church)
 Pro-cathedral
 List of largest church buildings
 List of tallest church buildings
 List of Catholic basilicas
 Lists of buildings and structures

References

Lists of churches